Püştətala (also, Pushtabina, Pushtala, Pushtatala, and Pushtbina) is a village and municipality in the Balakan Rayon of Azerbaijan.  It has a population of 2,282.  The municipality consists of the villages of Püştətala, Qadaşbinə, Qamıştala, Pirgax, Qaravəlili, and Mollaçibinə.

References 

Populated places in Balakan District